Something Big may refer to:

 Something Big (film), a 1971 American film
 "Something Big" (Adventure Time), a 2014 TV episode
 Something Big (Mary Mary album) or the title song, 2011
 Something Big (Mick Fleetwood Band album) or the title song, 2004
 "Something Big" (song), by Shawn Mendes, 2014
 "Something Big", a song by Tom Petty and the Heartbreakers from Hard Promises
 "Something Big", the title song from the 1971 film, composed by Burt Bacharach and Hal David, first recorded by Mark Lindsay